LCSD may refer to:

 Left cardiac sympathetic denervation
 Leisure and Cultural Services Department, a department of Government of Hong Kong
 School districts in the United States
 Lamar County School District in Mississippi
 Leflore County School District in Mississippi
 Lewis and Clark School District in North Dakota
 Liverpool Central School District of Liverpool, New York
 Longwood Central School District of Suffolk County, New York
 Logan City School District of Utah